Illumio is an American business data center and cloud computing security company.

History
Illumio was founded in 2013 by Andrew Rubin and P. J. Kirner and is headquartered in Sunnyvale, California, United States. 

The initial $8 million round of  venture capital was led by Andreessen Horowitz. Steve Herrod, former CTO of VMware and managing director of General Catalyst Partners led the company’s $34.5 million round  with participation by Formation 8, Data Collective, Salesforce.com CEO Marc Benioff and Yahoo! founder Jerry Yang. BlackRock and Accel a $100 million round with participation from  a number of investors including private investors John W. Thompson, Jerry Yang and Marc Benioff as well as previous investors.

In September 2019, Illumio was ranked #25 in the Forbes Cloud 100 list.

In February 2020, Stowe Australia, Australia's oldest and largest private electrical contractor, selected Illumio to provide security for its data centers across Australia.

Technology

Illumio’s technology decouples security from the underlying network and hypervisor. This allows for a security approach that works across a variety of computing environments, including private data centers, private clouds, and public clouds.

Illumio Adaptive Security Platform (ASP) uses the context (state, relationships, etc.) of workloads (bare-metal and virtual servers, etc.) in the computing environment and keeps security policies intact.
 
Unlike traditional security systems such as firewalls that rely on imperative programming techniques due to static networking constructs, Illumio Adaptive Security Platform is based on declarative programming and computes security in real time.

References

External links
Official website

2013 establishments in California
Technology companies based in the San Francisco Bay Area